Momentum is an American-German television film that premiered on Sci Fi Channel on July 26, 2003. The film was directed by James Seale.

Plot
Physics professor Zach Shefford (Grayson McCouch) has regarded his telekinetic gifts as a curse rather than a blessing. This sentiment is obviously not shared by ruthless Pentagon agent Raymond Addison (Louis Gossett Jr.), who recruits Shefford for a dangerous mission in which his "second sight" talents will be taxed to the utmost. It seems that, back in 1977, Addison had overseen Project Momentum, wherein dozens of telekinetics were brought together ostensibly for the purpose of benefiting mankind. But the project got out of hand when the participants' powers became too powerful and deadly, forcing Addison to kill them all.

However, one of the participants, Adrian Geiger (Michael Massee), managed to escape, and is now at large, with a vast telekinetic army at his beck and call. It is Shefford's job to infiltrate Geiger's camp and finish the job that Addison had started. Upon falling in love with fellow telekinetic Tristen Geiger (Nicki Aycox), Shefford finds that his loyalties are wavering—and begins to suspect that the villains in this particular melodrama may in fact be the heroes, and vice versa.

FBI agents Jordan Ripps (Teri Hatcher) and Frank McIntyre (Carmen Argenziano), who have been investigating an armored-car hijacking, follow Zach to Geiger. A telekinetic tug-of-war leads to a psychic showdown at the complex where Project Momentum was developed. Zach must finally choose the side to be on when telekinetic war breaks out. With Tristen prepared to follow in her father's footsteps and telekinetic sleeper cells in place across the nation, the momentum is building.

Cast
 Louis Gossett Jr. as Raymond Addison
 Teri Hatcher as FBI Agent Jordan Ripps
 Grayson McCouch as Zachary Shefford
 Michael Massee as Adrian Geiger
 Nicki Aycox as Tristen Geiger
 Carmen Argenziano as FBI Agent Frank McIntyre
 Morocco Omari as Lincoln
 Zahn McClarnon as "Hawk"
 Daniel Dae Kim as FBI Agent Frears
 Alexondra Lee as Brooke
 Zach Galligan as FBI Director Hammond
 Brad Greenquist as Martin Elias 
 Sean Blakemore as Floor Cop #2

External links

 

Syfy original films
2003 films
2003 television films
German television films
English-language German films
2003 science fiction films
CineTel Films films
Films about telekinesis
2000s American films